Center Line is a city in Macomb County in the U.S. state of Michigan, surrounded entirely by the city of Warren. The population was 8,257 at the 2010 census.

History
Historically, the land that Center Line came to occupy was swamp and wilderness until the early nineteenth century.  As land became scarce, French, German, Belgian, and Irish immigrants began clearing the forests and draining the swamps.  Center Line was known as Kunrod's Corner during the mid-nineteenth century. The theory is that the French named it Center Line because it was the middle of three Potowatomi trails from Fort Detroit to northern trading posts.  The 'center line' was the trail used from Detroit to Utica.  The community received its initial start when Catholics decided to build a church so that they would not have to walk to St. Mary's in Detroit for Sunday Mass.  This church (St. Clement's) was established in 1854 and attracted more Catholic settlers into the area.  In 1863, the first general store was constructed by Joeseph Buechel.  On July 19, 1878, Hieronymous Engelmann was the first postmaster, and he was succeeded in 1885 by Sophia Buechel.  The "Centre Line" post office closed on July 31, 1906, and the name was restored to Center Line thereafter.  In this era, street car tracks connected Detroit to Center Line along Van Dyke Road, and Ten Mile Road was the final stop of the street car.  The village was incorporated in 1925 in the center of Warren Township, which is now the City of Warren, and was incorporated as a city in 1936.

Geography

Demographics

2010 census
As of the census of 2010, there were 8,257 people, 3,632 households, and 1,988 families residing in the city. The racial makeup of the city was 82.5% White, 12.0% African American, 0.4% Native American, 2.5% Asian, 0.1% from other races, and 2.5% from two or more races. Hispanic or Latino of any race were 1.7% of the population.

There were 3,632 households, of which 27.7% had children under the age of 18 living with them, 32.0% were married couples living together, 17.5% had a female householder with no husband present, 5.2% had a male householder with no wife present, and 45.3% were non-families. 40.2% of all households were made up of individuals, and 18.1% had someone living alone who was 65 years of age or older. The average household size was 2.22 and the average family size was 3.01.

The median age in the city was 41.2 years. 21.4% of residents were under the age of 18; 8.2% were between the ages of 18 and 24; 25.1% were from 25 to 44; 27.5% were from 45 to 64; and 17.7% were 65 years of age or older. The gender makeup of the city was 46.1% male and 53.9% female.

85.9% of residents 25 or older hold a high school degree.  10.8% of residents 25 or older hold a bachelor's degree or higher.  Median household income was $30,752.  21.3% of the population lives below the federal poverty line.

2000 census
As of the census of 2000, there were 8,531 people, 3,821 households, and 2,074 families residing in the city. The racial makeup of the city was 93.82% White, 3.09% African American, 0.25% Native American, 1.01% Asian, 0.26% from other races, and 1.57% from two or more races. Hispanic or Latino of any race were 1.51% of the population.

There were 3,821 households, out of which 24.2% had children under the age of 18 living with them, 36.8% were married couples living together, 13.7% had a female householder with no husband present, and 45.7% were non-families. 40.9% of all households were made up of individuals, and 22.5% had someone living alone who was 65 years of age or older.  The average household size was 2.18 and the average family size was 2.99.

In the city, the population was spread out, with 21.8% under the age of 18, 6.9% from 18 to 24, 28.5% from 25 to 44, 20.5% from 45 to 64, and 22.4% who were 65 years of age or older.  The median age was 40 years. For every 100 females, there were 81.5 males.  For every 100 females age 18 and over, there were 75.5 males.

The median income for a household in the city was $31,677, and the median income for a family was $47,241. Males had a median income of $39,947 versus $26,487 for females. The per capita income for the city was $19,066.  About 10.6% of families and 13.3% of the population were below the poverty line, including 17.9% of those under age 18 and 14.4% of those age 65 or over.

Arts and culture

Annual events
The Center Line Independence Festival is a celebration of the community's ongoing independence from the community that surrounds it (i.e., Warren, MI), and the nation's independence.  The event began in 2016, the community's 80th Birthday celebration, and continues as an annual celebration of an incorporated city with live bands, carnival, arts and crafts, children's events and activities, local food vendors and restaurants, beer tent, and its always popular fireworks display.

Historical markers
Two recognized Michigan historical markers are at:
 St. Clement Catholic Church
 St. Clement Catholic Cemetery

Politics
The mayor of Center Line is Robert Binson.

Center Line is within Michigan's 9th Congressional District and Andy Levin is the congressional representative.  Center Line is within Michigan's 9th State Senate District and Steven M. Bieda serves as the Michigan State Senator.  Center Line is within Michigan's 28th State House District and is represented by Lori Stone.

Center Line voters lean towards the Democratic Party.  In 2014 midterm elections, 63.7% of voters chose Gary Peters (D) over 27.8% for Terri Lynn Land (R).  Statewide results were 55% for Peters and 41% for Land.  In a closer race, 56.4% chose Mark Schauer (D) over 39.1% for Rick Snyder (R).  Statewide results were 47% for Schauer and 51% for Snyder.

Education
Most Center Line residents are zoned to schools in Center Line Public Schools, including Center Line High School. A small portion of the city is in Van Dyke Public Schools, served by Lincoln High School.

St. Clement Catholic School was in Center Line. It was established in 1857. It had 110 students in the 2009-2010 year, and then 12 teachers and 89 students in its final year, 2010-2011. The parish decided to close the school as a parish takes a greater share of the costs if the number of students is under 100.

The archdiocese operated St. Clement High School in Center Line. It closed in 2005.  Macomb Christian Schools (MCS) occupied the old St. Clement High School building from 2017 until 2019, when MCS shutdown.

Infrastructure

Main highways
 runs east and west, on the north end of the city.
 leads northerly into the Van Dyke Freeway and runs north and south, from 9 1/2 Mile Rd. (Stephens) to 11 Mile Rd. (I-696).
East-west travel is mainly on the mile roads, that is 10 Mile Road which runs through the center of the community, and 11 Mile Road on the north border (Warren).  See Mile Road System (Detroit).

References

External links

 City of Center Line official website
 Center Line, MI Historical Information

Cities in Macomb County, Michigan
1936 establishments in Michigan
Enclaves in the United States